The Alien Factor is a 1978 science fiction horror film written, edited, produced, and directed by Don Dohler. The film centers on a small town that is besieged by three aliens that have crash-landed in the nearby forest.

Plot

A spaceship crashes in a sparsely populated area of Earth and three horrific aliens survive the accident. The grotesque extraterrestrials soon begin to terrorize the local residents, until one intrepid soul chooses to fight back.

Cast
 Don Leifert as Ben Zachary
 Tom Griffith as Sheriff Cinder
 Richard Dyszel as Mayor Wicker
 Mary Mertens as Edie Martin
 Richard Geiwitz as Pete
 George Stover as Steven
 Eleanor Herman as Mary Jane Carter
 Anne Frith as Dr. Ruth Sherman

Larry Schlechter and John Cosentino starred as the Inferbyce and Zagatile aliens respectively.

Production

The Alien Factor was filmed in 1972 and was shelved for six years before it was finally released theatrically on May 1, 1978.

Release

Home Media
The film was released on DVD by Retromedia Entertainment on February 26, 2002. Image Entertainment released the film on November 15, 2005 as a part of its Don Dohler Collection. It was last released by Mill Creek Entertainment on July 19, 2011.

Reception

TV Guide awarded the film a negative two out of five stars calling it "silly", also writing, "Only the undiscriminating will be able to sit through this one".
Dave Sindelar on his film review website Fantastic Movie Musings and Ramblings criticized the film's acting as "non-existent when it isn’t bad" and direction, which Sindelar equated to being "inspired by Larry Buchanan" and concluded that the film would only be of interest for  bad movie fanatics.
Critical Outcast gave the film a negative review writing, "The Alien Factor is undeniably bad, but it does have a certain energy to it, credit for a guy who went out and just did it. I would not really recommend you go out of your way for it. It is not a good movie, just admirable for the conditions under which it was made."
VideoHound's Golden Movie Retriever awarded the film one and a half out of four bones, noting that the film had "decent special effects".

Sequels

The film titled The Alien Factor 2: Alien Rampage was not actually a sequel. The sequel-sounding title was chosen by Retromedia distributor Fred Olen Ray to market the film on DVD in 2002. The original title for The Alien Factor 2 was Alien Rampage. Alien Rampage was filmed in 1999 and was Don Dohler's comeback movie after an 11-year hiatus from filmmaking.

References

External links
TheAlienFactor.com – Official site
 
 
 
 

Alien invasions in films
American independent films
1978 films
1978 horror films
American science fiction horror films
Films about extraterrestrial life
Films shot in Baltimore
1970s English-language films
1970s science fiction horror films
1970s monster movies
1978 independent films
Films directed by Don Dohler
1970s American films